Kolotilovka is a rural locality (a selo) and the administrative center of Kolotilovskoye Rural Settlement, Krasnoyaruzhsky District, Belgorod Oblast, Russia. The population was 371 as of 2010. There are 8 streets.

Geography 
Kolotilovka is located 20 km west of Krasnaya Yaruga (the district's administrative centre) by road. Pokrovka is the nearest rural locality.

References 

Rural localities in Krasnoyaruzhsky District